Janardhan Singh Sigriwal  is an Indian politician of Bharatiya Janata Party. He is a member of the 17th Lok Sabha  (the lower house of the Parliament of India) representing Maharajganj (Bihar Lok Sabha constituency). Earlier He won Bihar assembly elections in 2000, Feb-2005, October 2005 from Jalalpur. He represented Chapra seat since 2010 in Bihar assembly. He was also Minister of Labour Resources. He was a sports and youth minister in Nitish Kumar cabinet.

Background family and education
He was born in Saran district in Bihar. He studied in local schools and graduated from  Rajendra College, Chapra. At present his residence is in Jalalpur (Block) in Saran district in Bihar.

Political career
He was first elected MLA from Jalalpur seat. After that he shifted to Chapra seat and Won that seat. He remained MLA of Chapra till he won the 2014 Lok Sabha elections from Maharajganj . He was among the ministers who were removed when JDU broke the alliance unilaterally.

Fame India Best Twenty Five MP Award for 2020 for most Responsible MP went to Janardhan Singh Sigriwal.

Parliamentary works
On 12/07/2019 Janardan Singh Sigriwal, Member of Parliament of Bharatiya Janata Party and representing Maharajganj Parliamentary constituency has moved private member bill, Compulsory Voting Bill 2019 for making voting Compulsory all eligible voters in Lok Sabha.

References

External links
Janardan Singh Sigriwal

1959 births
Living people
Bihar MLAs 2000–2005
People from Saran district
India MPs 2014–2019
People from Maharajganj district
State cabinet ministers of Bihar
Bihar MLAs 2005–2010
Bihar MLAs 2010–2015
Bharatiya Janata Party politicians from Bihar
India MPs 2019–present
Indian Hindus
Bihari politicians